is a Japanese stunt performer and suit actor from Saitama Prefecture. He has been cast in many leading roles in the Super Sentai and Kamen Rider series, portraying a diverse range of characters. 

Takaiwa began his career with the Japan Action Club stunt agency when he was a high school student, and currently belongs to his own stunt performance agency, Team T.A.W (Takaiwa Action Widen). He is married to retired stunt performer and suit actress Rie Murakami, who is also the director of Team T.A.W. Their second son Shinta is also a stunt performer.

Stunt/Suit Actor Roles

Super Sentai Series

Kamen Rider Series

Metal Hero Series

Others

Non-suit Actor Roles

References

External links
Team T.A.W (Takaiwa Action Widen) 

1968 births
Living people
Actors from Saitama Prefecture
Japanese male actors
Japanese stunt performers